"Make Believe" is a song by the American rock band Toto, released as the second single (third in Europe) from their triple platinum 1982 album Toto IV. It peaked at number 19 in Cash Box magazine and at #30 on the Billboard Hot 100 chart on September 25, 1982. The song was also featured on the video game Grand Theft Auto: Vice City Stories on the radio station Emotion 98.3.

Cash Box called it "sunny summer pop that should reach the top," saying that "the opening piano chords recall The Beach Boys."  Billboard described it as a "hard-edged yet downtempo love song," saying "Piano triplets point to '50s rock classics, while synthesizer and buzzsaw guitar accents underline its contemporary vintage."

Personnel 
Toto
 Bobby Kimball – lead and backing vocals
 Steve Lukather – guitars, backing vocals
 David Paich – pianos, synthesizer, backing vocals
 Steve Porcaro – synthesizer
 David Hungate – bass
 Jeff Porcaro – drums, percussion

Additional musicians
Tom Kelly – backing vocal
Jon Smith – saxophone

Production
 Tom Knox  – recording engineer

References 

Toto (band) songs
1982 songs
Songs written by David Paich